Remember The Laughter is the first solo studio album by American guitarist Ray Toro. The album was self-released on November 18, 2016. It was Toro's first album since the original disbandment of American rock band My Chemical Romance.

Track listing

Personnel
Additional Personnel
Ray Toro: guitars, vocals, drums, bass, keyboards, samples, overdubs
Jarrod Alexander: drums on "Walking In Circles", "We Save", "Take The World", "The Lucky Ones", and "Remember The Laughter"
Jamie Muhoberac: keyboards, piano, programming on "Walking In Circles", "Requiem", "Look At You Now", and "Hope For The World"
Tim Pierce: guitars on "Requiem" and guitars and villette gryphon on "Look At You Now"
Chris Chaney: bass on "Requiem" and "Look At You Now"
Steve Boeddeker: background vocals on "We Save"
David C. Hughes: background vocals on "We Save"
Andre Zweers: background vocals on "We Save"
Tom Rasulo: drums and additional programming on "Requiem" and "Look At You Now"
Doug McKean: arranging, engineering
David C. Hughes: mixer
Gene Grimaldi: mastering

References

2016 albums
Ray Toro albums